Tim Burke is an American born Canadian football coach who was the defensive coordinator for the Toronto Argonauts of the Canadian Football League. Burke was previously the head coach of the CFL's Winnipeg Blue Bombers.

Career
Burke played running back for Luther College in Decorah, Iowa from 1974 to 1977.  After graduating in 1977, Burke started his coaching career with the University of Minnesota.  He later coached at University of South Dakota, University of North Dakota, Ball State University, University of Wyoming, Indiana State University, and University of Kansas.  His most notable NCAA coaching job was as the defensive backs coach for Purdue University from 1997 to 1999, where he was a part of two Alamo Bowl championship teams (1997, 1998)

Burke made the move to the CFL as the defensive backs coach with Calgary Stampeders from 2005 to 2007.  He later joined the Montreal Alouettes as defensive coordinator under head coach Marc Trestman from 2008 to 2010, where he won two Grey Cups.  In 2011, he took over as defensive coordinator for the Blue Bombers.  The next year, Burke interviewed for the vacant Hamilton Tiger-Cats head coaching position, but did not get the job.  He returned to the Blue Bombers for the 2012 season and was promoted to interim head coach on August 25 following the dismissal of Paul LaPolice.  At the end of the season, the interim tag was removed and the Blue Bombers officially named Burke the 29th head coach in team history.

Burke was fired by the Blue Bombers only a year later, after the team finished last in the league with only three wins.  Shortly after, the Toronto Argonauts hired Burke as their new defensive coordinator. Burke left the Argonauts after one year for personal reasons.

Personal
Burke is a native of Cedar Rapids, Iowa.  He and his wife Rita live in Lawrence, Kansas during the off-season.

Burke has two sons from a previous marriage: Kelly is a sergeant in the United States Air Force and Evan is a former member of the gymnastics team at Temple University.

CFL coaching record

References

External links
 Purdue Boilermakers bio

Year of birth missing (living people)
Living people
American football running backs
Appalachian State Mountaineers football coaches
Ball State Cardinals football coaches
Calgary Stampeders coaches
Gardner–Webb Runnin' Bulldogs football coaches
Indiana State Sycamores football coaches
Luther Norse football players
Kansas Jayhawks football coaches
Minnesota Golden Gophers football coaches
North Dakota Fighting Hawks football coaches
Montreal Alouettes coaches
Purdue Boilermakers football coaches
South Dakota Coyotes football coaches
Tennessee Volunteers football coaches
Toronto Argonauts coaches
Winnipeg Blue Bombers coaches
Wyoming Cowboys football coaches
Sportspeople from Cedar Rapids, Iowa